Bo Nay Toe is a 2019 Burmese action-drama film, directed by Steel (Dwe Myittar) starring Nay Toe, Htun Ko Ko, Min Oo, Nay Myo Aung, Zin Wine, Htoo Char, Nay Ye, Thet Mon Myint, Paing Phyo Thu and Nang Khin Zay Yar.The film, produced by Thinkayta Film Production premiered in Myanmar on November 21, 2019.

Cast
Nay Toe as Bo Nay Toe
Htun Ko Ko as Ba Khet
Min Oo as Saw Ba Htun
Nay Myo Aung as Kyaw Khaung
Zin Wine
Htoo Char as Yetkha
Nay Ye as Rachet
Thet Mon Myint as Nan Kyar Nyo
Paing Phyo Thu as Rita
Nang Khin Zay Yar as Phyu Ma

References

2019 films
2010s Burmese-language films
Burmese drama films
Films shot in Myanmar